Marcia trionfale may refer to:

 Victory March (film), a 1976 Italian drama film
 Marcia trionfale (Hallmayer), the second anthem of the Pope and of the Vatican City State